Independiente Futbol Club  is a Salvadoran professional football club  based in San Vicente, San Vicente,  El Salvador. 
They currently play in the Primera División El Salvador , the top tier of El Salvador football. The club was formed in 1946 and has played at its home ground, Estadio Jiboa, since TBD.

History

Early history, golden era and decline
The team was founded in 1946 with the union of the 4 most representative teams of San Vicente, calling itself C.D. UDAL, a year later Independiente Futbol Clube was born. They were one of the first clubs to participate in the first professional division. They participated in the first division from 1948 to 1959 before being relegated for the first time in their history. The participated in the Segunda division until 1977, where they purchased the first division spot of ANTEL. It was during this spell did the club hit their golden period as they had several renowned players including  Jesus Gonzales, Carlos “Carlanga” Rivera , Joaquín Valencia, Ricardo “la Tuca” Gómez, Jesús González Barillas, Efrain Yin Gonzalez   Óscar "Lotario" Guerrero, Jose Maria Rivas, Ramón Maradiaga and Jorge González. The club reached the final twice in 1981 and 1982, the clubs lost the final to C.D. FAS and Atletico Marte respectively. Following these highs the club lost their top players and just two years later in 1984 were relegated to Segunda Division.

The club struggled financially and spent the next two decades moving between Segunda division, Tercera division and Semi Professional league. During this time between 1999 and 2001 they were known as Club Deportivo Real Independiente.

Merger, return to the primera division and decline
In 2006, the owners of Coca/Cola later renamed Nacional 1906 approached Independiente FC, the board voted on merging the club forming Independiente Nacional 1906, this was the shot in the arm the club needed as they won promotion to Primera division, however the poor results led the team to the decline in the 2007 Clausura.

Refoundation
After the relegation to Segunda Division they could not register in the new season in the 2007 Apertura for not fulfilling their financial obligations and the table went idle for several seasons, to the point of considering that the team had ceased to exist professionally, was until 2015 when they resume their activity when they register to compete in the Apertura Tournament of that year by purchasing a franchise in the Tercera Division, this because they lost the right to be in the Segunda Division after the long time elapsed after his descent from the Primera Division and his return to sports.

After a year in the Tercera Division , in January 2016, they decided to buy an invitation category and returned to Segunda Division, where they would reach the tournament of the Apertura Tournament that year when they defeated Turin F.C. getting half a ticket to the Major League, would return to final instances in the 2017 Clausura, but would fall with Audaz both in the final series of the tournament, and in the first defining party

In 2019, for the start of the Tournament 2019 Clausura it is announced that the club's leadership acquires the team's franchise Audaz, which due to economic problems and debts can not continue to hold in the first division, although for reasons of logistics handling in the tournament with the name and distinctive of the apastepecano club

Stadium

 Estadio Jiboa, San Vincente (1970-)
 Estadio Sergio Torres Riviera, Usultan (2020-)

Located in the center of the city of San Vicente, it is the largest stadium in the department with the remodeling that the INDES did, the athletic track was paved and illuminated, its initial capacity was 1500 people now reaching 8000 spectators
Among the repairs that were made can be mentioned: dressing room remodeling, stands repair, construction of six-lane asphalt running track, construction of sanitary services (men and women), improvement of the rainwater hydraulic system, a prefabricated perimeter wall, to provide greater security to users and fans who arrive at the stadium, which has a capacity for 8 thousand people, and general paint. Also, towers with luminaire panels were installed, which will allow that from now on, first, second and third division meetings can be developed; as well as amateur teams; and the Vincentian population can practice their physical activities at night

 Formerly known as "Estadio Vicentino", this venue was considered difficult for the visiting teams in championships of both Second and First Division of the Central American country, the same being occupied until 2007 when the club National Independent 1906 of the Major League descended subsequently disappearing, being again retaken by the redundant team Independent F.C. (San Vicente) which had taken it as headquarters in some parties in Third Division as it maintained its headquarters as a local in the  Jiboa Sugar Mill Court .
It hosts two teams of the Primera Division, of  'El Vencedor Sports Club'  alternate for not having their own stadium and the home of  'Independiente Fútbol Club  '

Independiente FC has two bar cores the `` 'Yellow Faithful'  and `` 'The ghost bar of the jiboa' , formerly LBDS, these are what encourage the team from start to finish, the  ' Faithful Yellow  'has lost a bit of prominence in recent years, they have probably merged.

They gave a spectacular tribute in the 19th minute to Erasmo Henriquez, a player who died a year earlier from an illness, this bar has also lost three of its members  'Manyula'  was the leader,  'Chato'  and the  'Pijuyo'  were always present.

During stadium renovations in 2020, they played their matches in the Estadio Sergio Torres Rivera

Players

Current squad
As of:

Out on loan

In

Out

Management and support staff

Coaching staff

Sponsors
Companies with which Independiente Fútbol Club has sponsorship agreements:

 Official shirt sponsors - Acodjar de R.L. INJiboa, Rivera's Sports, Electrolit, Gym Maya
 Official shirt manufacturer - PS Sports

Records and statistics

Club records
 First victory in the Primera Division for Independiente: 3-2 TBD, 1977
 First goalscorer in the Primera Division for Independiente:  TBD v TBD, 1977
 Largest Home victory, Primera División: 4-1 v Chalatenango 2 February 2020
 Largest Away victory, Primera División: 3-0 v Pasaquina, 29 October 2018
 Largest Home loss, Primera División: 1–3 v Chalatenango, 4 November 2018
 Largest Away loss, Primera División: 0-8 v Aguila, October 28, 2007  
 Highest home attendance: 2,000 v Primera División, 2018
 Highest away attendance: 1,000 v Primera División, San Salvador, 2018
 Highest average attendance, season: 49,176, Primera División
 Most goals scored, season, Primera División: 55 goals, 1982 Season
 Worst season: Primera Division 1984 & Apertura 2006: 4 wins, 7 draws and 16 losses (15 points) and 4 wins, 3 draws and 11 losses (15 points)

Individual records
 Record appearances (all competitions): TBD, 822 from 1957 to 1975
 Record appearances (Primera Division): Paraguayan Jorge Caceres, 64 from 2018 to 2019
 Most capped player for El Salvador: 62 (0 whilst at Independiente), Magico Gonzalez
 Most international caps for El Salvador while a Independiente player: 1, TBD
 Most caps won whilst at Independiente: 1, TBD.
 Record scorer in league: TBD, 16
 Most goals in a season (all competitions): TBD, 62 (1927/28) (47 in League, 15 in Cup competitions)
 Most goals in a season (Primera Division): Óscar Gustavo “Lotario” Guerrero, 19 (1982)

Top goalscorers 

Note: Players in bold text are still active with Independiente FC

Team captains

Coaches

Club Deportivo Real Independiente/ Independiente Nacional 1906
 Carlos Antonio Meléndez (2002- June 2006)
 Juan Ramon Paredes (July 2006 –Sept 2006)
 Juan Quarterone (Oct 2006 – Mar 2007)
 Rubén Alonso (April 2007 – Jun 2007)

Independiente de San Vicente
 Guillermo "Loro" Castro (1978–1980)
 Julio del Carmen Escobar Ortiz (1982)
 Luis Alonso Santana "El Chispo" (1983)
 Iván Antonio Ruíz Zuñiga (2003–2005)
 Hiatus – Club suspended (2008– 2014)
 Ricardo Garcia "La Culebra" (2014 – Oct 2015)
 Nelson Mauricio Ancheta	(Feb 2016 -Sep 2016)
 Willy Mirnda (interim) (Sep 2016 – Oct 2016)
 Rubén Alonso (Oct 2016 – Aug 2017)
 Edgar Henríquez (Aug 2017 – Dec 2017)
 Ivan Ruiz (Dec 2017 -May 2018)	
 Wilson Angulo (July 2018 – Sep 2018)
 Ivan Ruiz (Sep 2018– Nov 2018)
 Orlando Hernandez Torres (Nov 2018 – Dec 2019)
 Hiatus – Club suspended (Jan 2019– June 2019)
 Juan Cortes Diéguez (July 2019–Oct 2019)
 Omar Sevilla (Oct 2019- Mar 2020)
 William Renderos Iraheta (Mar 2020-)

Honours

Domestic honours
 Primera Division and predecessors
 Runners up: 1981, 1982
 Segunda División Salvadorean and predecessors 
 Champions: 2016 Apertura

References

Independiente Nacional 1906
2006 establishments in El Salvador
2007 disestablishments in El Salvador